Gerhard Rodax (29 August 1965 – 16 November 2022) was an Austrian professional footballer who played as a striker.

Club career
Rodax was born in Tattendorf. He started his professional career at Admira Wacker and stayed with them for seven years, becoming Austrian Football Bundesliga top goalscorer in 1990. That earned him a contract at Spanish side Atlético Madrid, but he lasted just over one season with them and returned to Austria to join Rapid Wien where he finished his career in 1993 at 28 years of age. In the 1995–96 season he made a short comeback at Admira.

International career
Rodax made his debut for Austria in 1985 and was a participant at the 1990 FIFA World Cup, where he scored in the 2–1 win over the USA in Florence.

Rodax won 20 international caps, scoring three goals. His last international was a May 1991 friendly match against Sweden.

Death
Rodax died near Traiskirchen on 16 November 2022, at the age of 57.

Career statistics
Scores and results list Austria's goal tally first, score column indicates score after each Rodax goal.

Honours
Atlético Madrid
 Copa del Rey: 1991

Individual
 Austrian Football Bundesliga top scorer: 1990

References

External links
 Rapid stats - Rapid Archive

1965 births
2022 deaths
People from Baden District, Austria
Austrian footballers
Footballers from Lower Austria
Association football forwards
Austria international footballers
1990 FIFA World Cup players
Austrian Football Bundesliga players
La Liga players
FC Admira Wacker Mödling players
Atlético Madrid footballers
SK Rapid Wien players
Austrian expatriate footballers
Austrian expatriate sportspeople in Spain
Expatriate footballers in Spain
20th-century Austrian people
Railway accident deaths in Austria